Panthea reducta is a moth of the family Noctuidae.

The larvae probably feed on Pinus occidentalis.

External links
Revision of the New World Panthea Hübner (Lepidoptera, Noctuidae) with descriptions of 5 new species and 2 new subspecies

Pantheinae
Moths described in 2009
Insects of the Dominican Republic